Edward "Monk" Eastman (1875 – December 26, 1920) was a New York City gangster who founded and led the Eastman Gang in the late 19th and early 20th century; it became one of the most powerful street gangs in the city. His aliases included Joseph "Joe" Morris, Joe Marvin, William "Bill" Delaney, and Edward "Eddie" Delaney. Eastman is considered to be one of the last of the 19th-century New York City gangsters who preceded the rise of Arnold Rothstein and the Jewish mob. Later, more sophisticated, organized criminal enterprises also included the predominantly Italian Cosa Nostra.

Early life

Monk was born Edward Eastman in 1875 in the Corlear's Hook section of the Lower East Side of Manhattan  of New York City, New York to Samuel Eastman, a Civil War veteran and wallpaper-hanger, and his wife Mary (Parks) Eastman. They were most likely descended from English ancestors of the colonial period. By the time Monk was five, his father had abandoned the family. Mary moved with her children to her father George Parks' home on the Upper East Side.

According to the 1880 United States Census, 5-year-old Edward Eastman lived with his mother and other family on East Seventy-Fifth Street, in Manhattan.  The household was headed by his maternal grandfather George Parks, age 68, who worked in a dry goods store. Parks was born in New York, as were both his parents. In addition to Edward, the Eastman family included Mary Eastman, age 35; and her daughters Lizzie, age 10; Ida, age 8; and Francine, age 3. Everyone was born in Manhattan, with the exception of Lizzie, who was born in California.  Both George Parks and his daughter Mary Eastman were recorded as having been divorced.

In the 1870 U.S. census, Mary Eastman had been living on Cannon Street in the Lower East Side of Manhattan with her husband Samuel Eastman, age 40, born in New York and working as a paper hanger.  Living with them were their children Lizzie and Willie, age 3, born in New York.  Willie likely died young, as he was not listed with the family in 1880.

In the 1860 census, Samuel Eastman was living as a single man in Manhattan in the household of Thomas McSpedon, from a prominent old NYC family.  His mentor's firm, McSpedon & Baker, on Pine Street in New York, was the official printer for the city government. In addition to running his business, McSpedon served as an elected Alderman in NYC and as appointed City Fire Marshall during the mid-19th century. Eastman worked as a paper hanger.

By the 1900 census, Mary Eastman lived in Queens on Curtis Avenue, with her daughters Elizabeth and Francine and their families. Edward Eastman is listed in the same census as a "bird salesman" residing on East First Street in Lower Manhattan, living with and married since 1896 to Margaret Eastman.

Going by the nickname "Monk", Eastman was not recorded as having been arrested until after his grandfather died. At some point, Parks helped his grandson set up a pet shop on Broome Street.  For years after being widely known as a gangster, Eastman listed "bird seller" as his occupation on government forms. At some point, he returned to live on the Lower East Side and became involved with the neighborhood gangs made up of poor, young men, often children of immigrants. Operations included a bike rental racket.

Ethnicity

Monk Eastman's ancestry has been a subject of debate by reporters and historians. Because his criminal enterprise involved so many members of Jewish-American organized crime, Eastman is frequently depicted as being Jewish (including by some newspapers of his period). But researchers have documented that he appears to have been of ethnic Protestant English descent. Records suggest that he was Christian and Protestant, if non-practicing. In his book The Jews of Sing Sing, the writer Ron Arons notes that none of Monk's sisters (nor his parents) were married in Jewish ceremonies. His maternal grandfather George Parks died in a Baptist rest home. When Eastman was buried, his service was performed by a Methodist pastor.

Criminal career
In 1898 Monk Eastman was arrested and convicted of larceny under the alias William Murray (one of the many Irish aliases which he used). He was jailed for three months on Blackwell's Island. During this time, he belonged to a gang of pimps and thieves known as the Allen Street Cadets.

The writer Herbert Asbury described Eastman as having a messy head of wild hair, wearing a derby two sizes too small for his head, sporting numerous gold-capped teeth, and often parading around shirtless or in My This tatters, always accompanied by his cherished pigeons. He had a broad five-foot-six inch frame. In time, Monk's reputation as a tough guy earned him the job of "sheriff" or bouncer at the New Irving Hall, a celebrated club on Broome Street, not far from his pet shop. At the New Irving Hall and Silver Dollar Smith's Saloon, Eastman became acquainted with Tammany Hall politicians, who were powerful in New York and deeply involved with the ethnic immigrant communities. They eventually put him and his cohort to work as "repeat voters" in elections and strong-arm men to intimidate the opposition.

Eastman's greatest rival was Paul Kelly (born Paolo Antonio Vaccarelli), immigrant leader of the majority-Italian Five Points Gang. In 1900, at the turn of the 20th century, Eastman lived at 221 E. 5th Street, about two blocks from Kelly's New Brighton Social Club at 57 Great Jones Street. The warfare between these two gangs reached a fever pitch on September 17, 1903, with a protracted gun battle on Rivington Street among dozens of gangsters. One gang member was killed and a second reported fatally wounded, by a policeman. Numerous innocent civilians were injured. Some 18 members of the Eastman gang were reported as arrested.

Tammany Hall worked closely with both Kelly and Eastman to mobilize their members in elections and patronage schemes.  Its officials grew tired of the feuding and the bad press generated when civilians were killed or injured in the gangs' cross-fire. In 1903, Tammany Hall set up a boxing match between Eastman and Kelly in an old barn in the Bronx to settle the feuding. The fight lasted two hours, with both men taking hard punishment before it was called a draw. The politicians pressed the leaders to call a truce and end the street violence.

Prison
On February 3, 1904, Eastman tried to rob a young man on 42nd Street and Broadway in Manhattan. As the man was being followed by two Pinkerton agents hired by the man's family to keep him out of trouble in the city, the agents intervened.  Eastman shot at them while escaping, but was caught by policemen responding to the shooting. Tired of bad publicity from Eastman, Tammany Hall refused to help him. Later that year, Eastman was convicted of attempted assault and sentenced to 10 years in prison at Sing Sing penitentiary.

In 1909, Eastman was released after serving five years in prison. During his absence, the Eastman Gang had split into several factions; one of his top men, Max Zwerbach, was dead. Since none of the surviving gang factions wanted Eastman as their leader, he was effectively out of power.  For several years, Eastman reverted to petty thievery. During this period, he became addicted to opium and served several short jail terms.

Military service
After the United States entered World War I in 1917, the 42-year-old Eastman decided to join the army. During his military physical, the doctor observed all the knife and bullet scars on Eastman's body and asked him which wars he had been in. Eastman replied, "Oh! A lot of little wars around New York." He served in France with "O'Ryan's Roughnecks," the 106th Infantry Regiment of the 27th Infantry Division.

Final years and death
After his discharge from the army, Eastman quickly returned to a life of petty crime. One of his partners was Jerry Bohan, a corrupt Prohibition agent. On the morning of December 26, 1920, Eastman and Bohan met with other men at the Bluebird Cafe in Lower Manhattan. Around 4:00 am, they argued over money, with Eastman and Bohan particularly at odds. When Bohan left, Eastman followed him and accused him of being a rat. Feeling threatened, Bohan fatally shot Eastman several times with his pistol.

Eastman was buried with full military honors in Cypress Hills Cemetery in the Brooklyn borough of New York City, New York. Bohan was later convicted of his murder and served three years in prison.

In popular culture 
Eastman's life and exploits were fictionalized in the Jorge Luis Borges short story "El proveedor de iniquidades Monk Eastman" ("Monk Eastman, Purveyor of Iniquities"), included in the Borges collection Historia universal de la infamia ("A Universal History of Infamy"). He is also a recurring character in the Molly Murphy mystery series by Rhys Bowen.

References

Sources

External links
Monk Eastman: The Terror of Lower East Side, New Criminologist
Monk Eastman & the Lower Eastside, Gangster City
New York Times: "'Monk' Eastman Caught after Pistol Battle", New York Times
 Neil Hanson's Lecture on Monk Eastman at the Pritzker Military Museum & Library

1875 births
1920 deaths
1920 murders in the United States
United States Army personnel of World War I
Burials at Cypress Hills Cemetery
Eastman Gang
American crime bosses
Deaths by firearm in Manhattan
People from the Upper East Side
People murdered in New York City
Male murder victims
Inmates of Sing Sing